S.M. Zaheer (एस एम ज़हीर) is an Indian character actor. He acted in the early Hindi TV dramas Hum Log and Buniyaad on Doordarshan.

Early life and career
He belongs to Asandra village in Barabanki district of Uttar Pradesh. He is a qualified engineer and worked in a brewery (Mohan Meakin Ltd) in Mohan Nagar, Ghaziabad.

He started acting in drama. He got recognition when he acted in Vijay Tendulkar's play Jaat Hi Poochho Sadhu Ki in 1975 in Shri Ram Centre near Mandi House, New Delhi. He acted in many plays. Then he got roles in TV drama such as Hum Log and Buniyaad. From there, he moved to Bombay and got roles in Hindi feature films.

Filmography
Films
 Kalank (2019)
 Mango Dreams (2016)
 Prem Ratan Dhan Payo (2015)....as Doctor
 Ya Rab (2014)
 Aarakshan (2011)
 Zokkomon (2011)
 Lafangey Parindey (2010)
 Admissions Open... Do What You Are Born For... (2010)
 My Name Is Khan (2010)
 Coffee House (2009)
Ishwar Sakshi (2009)
 Veer-Zaara (2004)
 Police Force: An Inside Story (2004)
 Zubeidaa (2001)
 Sangharsh (1999)
 Maachis (1996)
 Sardari Begum (1996)
 Criminal (1995)
 Naajayaz (1995)
 Akayla (1991)
 Jungle Love (1991)
 Ek Ruka Hua Faisla (1986)
 Ab Ayega Mazaa (1984)
 Aao Hajj Karen (1980)

TV Serials / Tele Film
 Special Ops (2020) Hotstar....  as Noor Baksh
 Mariam Khan - Reporting Live (2018—present)
 Ghoul (2018) Netflix 
 Tere Sheher Mein (2015)
 Chintu Chinki Aur Ek Badi Si Love Story (2011)
 Vicky Ki Taxi (2009)
 Chhoti Bahu... Sindoor bin Suhagan (2009)
 Neem Ka Ped
 Maryada (2009)
 Kayamath (2007)
 Kasturi (2007)
 Meri Doli Tere Angana (2007–08)
 Chotti Bahu (2008-2011)
 Saat Phere (2005)
 Saarrthi (2004)
1857 Kranti (2002)
 Daaman (2001) 
Muskaan 1999 
Badalte Rishte (1996)
 Dastoor (1996)
 Phir Wahi Talash (1989-1990)
 Fakhar Uddin Ali Ahmad (1992) 
Khaali Haath 1991
 Buniyaad (1986)
 Hum Log (1984)

References

External links 
 

Indian male film actors
Indian male television actors
1932 births
Living people
People from Ghaziabad, Uttar Pradesh
20th-century Indian male actors
21st-century Indian male actors
Male actors from Uttar Pradesh